Aida Chuyko (born 24 November 1936) is a Soviet athlete. She competed in the women's long jump at the 1964 Summer Olympics.

References

1936 births
Living people
Athletes (track and field) at the 1964 Summer Olympics
Soviet female long jumpers
Olympic athletes of the Soviet Union
Place of birth missing (living people)